The San Luis Obispo Handicap is an American Thoroughbred horse race held annually at Santa Anita Park in Arcadia, California. The race is open to horses age four and up, willing to race one and one-half miles on the turf. A Grade II event, it offers a purse of $150,000.

Inaugurated as the Washington's Birthday Handicap in 1950, it was run on dirt until 1954 when it became a turf race. For 1973, 1980 and 2005, the race was transferred to the dirt track. There was no race from 1963 through 1967 but returned in 1968 as the San Luis Obispo Handicap, named for the city of San Luis Obispo further up the Central Coast of California from Santa Anita Park.

It was started on the turf course's backstretch, instead of the hillside, in 1990, 1992 and 1993. Since inception it has been contested at various distances:
 7 furlongs : 1950, 1952–53
  miles (10 furlongs) : 1951, 1954, 1970
 About  miles (about 12 furlongs) : 1968, 1972 and 1993
  miles (12 furlongs) : 1955–1969, 1971, 1973–1992, 1994–present

The San Luis Obispo Handicap was run in two divisions in 1968, 1972, and 1974.

Records
Speed  record: (at current distance of  miles)
 2:23.80 – Captain Cee Jay  (1974)

Most wins:
 2 – St. Vincent (1955, 1957)
 2 – Great Communicator (1988, 1989)
 2 – Spring House (2008, 2009)

Most wins by an owner:
 3 – Johnny Longden and/or Alberta Ranches (1955, 1957, 1982)

Most wins by a jockey:
 9 – Bill Shoemaker (1952, 1956, 1962, 1972 (2), 1977, 1980, 1983, 1987)

Most wins by a trainer:
 8 – Charles Whittingham (1968, 1971, 1972 (2), 1977, 1983, 1987, 1990)

Winners

External links
 The 2009 San Luis Obispo Handicap at the NTRA

Horse races in California
Santa Anita Park
Graded stakes races in the United States
Flat horse races for four-year-olds
Open middle distance horse races
Turf races in the United States
Recurring sporting events established in 1950
1950 establishments in California